Greg Cameron (born 10 April 1988) is a Scottish footballer who last played for Montrose. He previously played for Dundee United between 2004 and 2010, from where he had loan spells with Partick Thistle, St Johnstone, Shamrock Rovers and Raith Rovers. He then played for Brechin City before joining Montrose, initially on loan. He has represented Scotland up to and including under-21 level.

Domestic career
Cameron progressed through the Dundee United youth program, making his début midway through the 2004–05 season. In October 2006, his progress saw him sign a new contract, taking him up to 2010.

In late October 2007, having played twice for United weeks earlier, Cameron joined Partick Thistle on a month's loan, reuniting him with former manager Ian McCall. After playing three league matches, Cameron returned to Tannadice, moving on loan to St Johnstone in January 2008. After just six games, however, Cameron suffered a knee injury, ending his season. Featuring just three times for Dundee United in the 2007–08 season, Cameron failed to feature in any first team match day squad in 2008–09 and was sent on loan to Shamrock Rovers until June. With one year of his contract remaining, Cameron returned to United, although he joined Notts County on trial in August, which failed to lead to a move.

In June 2013 Cameron signed for Brechin City.

References

External links 
 Official Dundee United website profile
 

1988 births
Living people
Footballers from Dundee
Scottish footballers
Scotland youth international footballers
Scotland under-21 international footballers
Association football midfielders
Dundee United F.C. players
Raith Rovers F.C. players
Partick Thistle F.C. players
St Johnstone F.C. players
Brechin City F.C. players
Scottish Premier League players
Scottish Football League players
League of Ireland players
Shamrock Rovers F.C. players
Expatriate association footballers in the Republic of Ireland
Scottish Professional Football League players
Montrose F.C. players